Colchester railway station (also known as Colchester North) is on the Great Eastern Main Line (GEML) in the East of England, and is the primary station serving the city of Colchester, Essex. Its three-letter station code is COL. The junction is grade-separated so trains branching to and from Colchester Town or the Sunshine Coast Line do not cross the main line.

Colchester station was opened in 1843 by the Eastern Counties Railway. It is currently managed by Greater Anglia, which also operates all trains serving the station.

History

The station was opened on 29 March 1843 by the Eastern Counties Railway (ECR) and was named simply as Colchester. Locally, however, it is also known as Colchester North to distinguish it from Colchester Town station. Buses also use this unofficial name. Colchester station is not particularly conveniently sited for the city, but buses connect to the city centre. Colchester Town station is closer to the city centre (hence its name).

As passenger numbers passing through the station increased, particularly with growth on the Sunshine Coast Line, the layout of the station became inadequate. The station had also been built on a relatively sharp curve.

Prior to electrification of the lines, Colchester was modernised in 1962, with a new station building on the north side of the tracks. Following the reconstruction, the station has two main platforms. The "up" (London-bound) side comprises two platforms, numbers 3 and 4, which have an unusual layout: 3 is on the up main line and is served by intercity trains from Norwich, while 4 is on the up branch line which merges with the up main line where the two platforms join end-to-end. However, with the unusual layout of platforms, Colchester station gains the longest physical platform in the UK as the entire length (from platform 3 to 4) measures at 620 m (2034 ft) [Gloucester station has the longest unbroken platform at 1977 ft]. The junction is protected by a trap leading to friction buffer stops. There are also bay platforms at both ends of the up main platform. The London-end bay (platform 6) is used for peak trains to and from London. Previously this platform was used for frequent services for the Sudbury Branch Line. The other bay platform (platform 5) is used for services to Colchester Town and Walton-on-the-Naze. The "down" side platform is an island platform with two faces, one on the down main, and one on the down branch line. Platform 1 is mainly used for Clacton-on-Sea trains and occasionally for Norwich trains.

The main ticket office is a modern glass-fronted design, sited on the north side of the station, and access to the platforms is via a subway. The previous station building is on the south side and provides access to the up platform for those with tickets or wanting to buy tickets from a machine. 
To the side of the main ticket office, there is a taxi rank, as well as multiple bus stops. Both entrances to the station have automatic ticket gates.

Former train operating company Anglia Railways operated services known as London Crosslink from Norwich to  via . This service started in 2000 and ended in 2002.

Accidents
On 12 July 1913, at approximately 3 pm, an express passenger train travelling at high speed collided with a light engine at Colchester due to a signalman's error. Part of the passenger train was derailed. The train's driver, guard and fireman were killed and 14 passengers were injured. The locomotive of the express – no. 1506 of Class S69 – was so badly damaged that it was scrapped.

Services

Trains are operated by Greater Anglia. The typical off-peak service comprises:
 1 train per hour (tph) to 
 5 tph to 

References

External links

Railway stations in Essex
Former Great Eastern Railway stations
Railway stations in Great Britain opened in 1843
Greater Anglia franchise railway stations
Buildings and structures in Colchester (town)
Transport in Colchester
1843 establishments in England
William Neville Ashbee railway stations
DfT Category B stations